George Hodges may refer to:

George Hodges (umpire), 19th-century Australian Test cricket umpire
George Hodges (theologian) (1856–1919), American Protestant Episcopal theologian
George Lloyd Hodges (1792–1862), British soldier and diplomat
George Tisdale Hodges (1789–1860), U.S. Representative from Vermont
George H. Hodges (1866–1947), U.S. politician 
George Hodges (priest) (1851–1921), Anglican priest

See also
George Hodge (disambiguation)